Tikəbənd (also, Tikəband, Takyaband, and Tikyaband) is a village and municipality in the Lerik Rayon of Azerbaijan.  It has a population of 1,056.  The municipality consists of the villages of Tikəbənd and Zardoni.

References 

Populated places in Lerik District